The red wolf (Canis rufus) is a mammal of the order Carnivora

Red wolf may also refer to:

Arts and entertainment
Red Wolf (comics), a Marvel Comics character
The Red Wolf, a 2003 novel by Liza Marklund

Military
HSC-84 "Red Wolves", a former United States Navy Reserve helicopter squadron
Red Wolves, a group of Qutaibi fighters during the Aden Emergency in what is now Yemen

Sports
Red Wolf (bull) #112 (1988–2006), a bucking bull of the year
Arkansas State Red Wolves, the teams of Arkansas State University
Chattanooga Red Wolves, a professional soccer team in Chattanooga, Tennessee
Florence RedWolves (now Florence Flamingos), a South Carolina amateur baseball team
Shaanxi Red Wolves, a Chinese women's professional basketball team

Animals
Dhole, another canine species, also known as red wolf